Llandyrnog United F.C. is a football team that was founded in 1975 in Llandyrnog, near Denbigh, Wales. Llandyrnog play in the North Wales Coast East Football League Premier Division which is in the fourth level of the Welsh football league system.

The club was formed after a few villagers met in the Golden Lion Public House.  The golden lion on the club crest is in recognition of this.  They were admitted into the Clwyd League Division 4 gaining promotion at the first attempt.  Llandyrnog remained in Division 2/3 until the end of 1978/79 when they were promoted as runners up.  The club spent over a decade in Division 1 until 1990/91 when they gained promotion to the Premier Division.   Llandyrnog were crowned champions at their first attempt and promoted to the Sealink Welsh Alliance. After a lengthy spell in this league Llandyrnog were relegated back to the Clwyd League Premier Division where they stayed until 2002/03 until manager John James was appointed and the club gained promotion back to the Welsh Alliance. Only one season was spent in this league as the Club gained back to back promotions into the Cymru Alliance for the first time in its history.

They stayed in the Cymru Alliance until the end of the 2008–09 season where they finished bottom of the table 20 points from safety.

Club honours

Leagues
Clwyd Football League Premier – Champions: 1991–92
Clwyd Football League – Champions: 1987–88
Clwyd Football League Division 4 – Champions: 1975–76

Cups
Clwyd Cup – Winners: 1989–90
Clwyd Premier Cup – Winners: 1991–92
Mackenzie Jones League Cup – Winners: 2002–03

References

External links
Llandyrnog United club website

Sport in Denbighshire
1975 establishments in Wales
Football clubs in Wales
Welsh Alliance League clubs
Association football clubs established in 1975
Cymru Alliance clubs
North Wales Coast Football League clubs
Clwyd Football League clubs